Ricardo Morales (born 1972) is an American musician.

Ricardo Morales may also refer to:
 Ricardo Morales (tennis) (1907–2007), Cuban professional tennis player
 Ricardo Morales (intelligence agent) (before 1960–1983), Cuban exile and FBI informant
 Ricardo Morales (Law & Order: LA), a fictional character on Law & Order: LA

See also 
 Morales (disambiguation)